Sacrifice is a Canadian thrash metal band from Toronto, Ontario. The band was formed by guitarists Rob Urbinati and Joe Rico in 1983. Sacrifice played a prominent role in the 1980s underground metal scene in Toronto, and along with Voivod, Razor and Annihilator, they are considered one of the "big four" of Canadian thrash metal. The band released four studio albums before parting ways in 1993. After coming back together to play a reunion concert in 2006, they released their fifth studio album The Ones I Condemn on Brazilian label Marquee Records in 2009. Although the band faced numerous line-up changes, especially in their early days, founding guitarists Urbinati, Rico and bassist Scott Watts recorded every studio album and demo with drummer Gus Pynn on everything but the Apocalypse Inside demo and CD.

History

Formation and first four albums 
Friends and guitarists Rob Urbinati and Joe Rico decided to form a metal band in 1983, playing cover versions of some of their favourite songs. They recruited Rico's friend Scott Watts to play bass, and Andrew Banks on drums, who was replaced by Craig Boyle. Singer John Baldy, a friend of Boyle's, also joined the band. Together they recorded a pair of rehearsal tapes — featuring their first original song "Turn in Your Grave", along with a variety of covers of songs by bands such as Black Sabbath, Metallica, and Judas Priest.

By early 1985, the majority of the band had decided to move towards a heavier and faster direction with Urbinati on vocals, ousting Baldy and Boyle, and were therefore in need of a new drummer. Ernst Flach filled the position for only a few live shows before leaving, as his drumming style did not fit the fast pace the band wanted to play. It was not until Gus Pynn had contacted the band for an audition that they finally found a permanent drummer. Now that they had a complete line-up, local record store employee Brian Taylor approached Sacrifice and local friends Slaughter to finance the recording of demos for these two bands in exchange for the profits made by selling the tapes at his shop. Both bands agreed, and Sacrifice released The Exorcism demo featuring new original songs. Later that year, Sacrifice opened a show in Toronto for Exodus, who were on their first North American tour. Sacrifice credits the growth of their band and the Toronto underground metal scene in general to their appearance at this show. As a result, the band signed a contract with Diabolic Force. In the fall of 1985, the band entered the Future Sound studio, to record the debut album Torment in Fire. The album was released in 1986 in Canada on Diabolic Force, and on Metal Blade Records in the United States and on Roadrunner Records in Europe. By the time the album was released, the band worked on new material. In July 1986, the band recorded another demo in the Open Sound Studio. This was followed by an appearance in Kitchener, Ontario, with Megadeth as the opening act for King Diamond. In September they played in Quebec City and the No Speed Limit Festival at the Spectrum in Montreal together with Possessed, Voivod, D.R.I. and Agnostic Front. In November 1986 Sacrifice opened up for Slayer on their Reign in Blood tour at the Concert Hall in Toronto.

In January 1987, the first appearances outside Canada followed with concerts in Detroit and Chicago. There followed further appearances in Canada until April 1987. The Band then entered Grant Avenue Studio in Hamilton, to record the album Forward to Termination. It was released again on Diabolic Force, Metal Blade and Roadrunner Records for the US and Europe. A music video for the song "Re-Animation" was also filmed. These were followed by the Milwaukee Metal Festival in July 1987 along with bands such as Death Angel, Trouble and King Diamond. In November 1987, they played with Nuclear Assault. Appearances in Ottawa, Quebec City and Montreal followed in December.

In December 1988 the band went into the Studio to record a new demo; Bassist Scott Watts played the electric guitar on a couple of out-take songs. A few days later Sacrifice performed as opening act along with the Goo Goo Dolls for Motörhead in Buffalo and Rochester. In 1989 the band recorded another demo. A few months later the band entered Phase One Studios in Toronto to record another album. It was produced by Joe Primeau and Brian Taylor. Again released on Diabolic Force, the album was titled Soldiers of Misfortune. The album was released in 1990 in Canada, and on March 5, 1991, in the United States. They also released a video for the album's title track. Towards the end of the year a tour followed with Razor. Drummer Gus Pynn left the band and was replaced by Mike Rosenthal, formerly of Dark Legion. In 1991 the band toured the U.S with British band Bolt Thrower and American thrash band Believer.

In 1993 Sacrifice went back to Phase One Studios to record the album Apocalypse Inside which was released on June 15, 1993, on Metal Blade records. It was co-produced by Dave Carlo (guitarist with Razor). During that summer bassist Scott Watts parted ways with the band and was replaced by Kevin Wimberley. After a tour of the United States in the same year in which the band supported Death, Sacrifice called it quits.

Urbinati went on to form Interzone (with Wimberley), Tenet (in 2002), and War Amp (in 2005). In 2004 Brazilian record label Marquee reissued the band's first 3 albums on CD .

Although the band faced numerous line-up changes, especially in their early days, founding guitarists Urbinati and Rico and bassist Scott Watts recorded every studio album and demo and drummer Gus Pynn played on everything but the Apocalypse Inside demo and CD.

Reunion 
In 2006, the band reunited and performed in Toronto at the 'Day of the Equinox II' festival, their reunion show of which a DVD, Live Reanimation, was planned but not released yet. Also in  August 2006, they released a compilation, 198666, and it has  the three demo's and live track's from early years.

In 2008, they entered Rouge Valley Studio in Toronto to record the album The Ones I Condemn, released on July 6, 2009, by Marquee Records from Brazil.

In late 2010 Sacrifice teamed up with punk rock band Propagandhi to release a 7-inch single where both bands perform cover tunes. Propagandi covered Corrosion of Conformity's hardcore/metal crossover "Technocracy" and Sacrifice covered Rush's "Anthem". The cover of "Anthem" was included as a bonus track on the Canadian issue of The Ones I Condemn.

On April 29, 2011, Sacrifice finally made it across the Atlantic to play their first show on European soil in Germany at the Keep It True Festival.

In February 2012 Sacrifice crossed the Pacific to play in Osaka, Japan, headlining the two-day True Thrash Festival.

Sacrifice also played shows in western Canada. The original and current line-up played April 17, 2015, in Vancouver at the Rickshaw Theatre and on April 18, 2015, in the Manitoba Metalfest at The Park Theatre in Winnipeg. 

Sacrifice headlined the 20th anniversary show of Inertia Entertainment on February 27, 2016, at The Opera House in Toronto.

By 2016, Sacrifice had been working on new material for the follow-up to The Ones I Condemn. There had been no news about new music from the band until December 2020, when they released a demo version of their first song in over a decade on YouTube, titled "World War V", which is expected to appear on the band's upcoming sixth studio album. Progress on the album had continued to be slow by April 2022, when bassist Scott Watts said on Facebook, "I guarantee you that we don't have a label, so there is no rush to record."

Lineup 

 Current members
 Rob Urbinati − vocals, lead and rhythm guitars (1983–1993, 2006–present)
 Joe Rico − lead and rhythm guitars (1983–1993, 2006–present)
 Scott Watts − bass (1983–1993, 2006–present)
 Gus Pynn − drums (1985–1990, 2006–present)

 Past members
 Andrew Banks – drums (1983)
 John Baldy − vocals (1983–1985)
 Craig Boyle − drums (1983–1985)
 Ernst Flach − drums (1985)
 Mike Rosenthal − drums (1990–1993)
 Kevin Wimberley − bass (1993)

 Timeline

Discography

Albums 
 Torment in Fire (1986), Diabolic Force/Metal Blade/Roadrunner
 Forward to Termination (1987), Diabolic Force/Metal Blade/Roadrunner/Restless
 Soldiers of Misfortune  (1990), Fringe Product – also, Metal Blade
 Apocalypse Inside (1993), Metal Blade
 The Ones I Condemn (2009), Marquee Records Brazil – Sonic Unyon/War on Music/Cyclone Empire

Compilation 
 198666 (2006), War on Music – limited edition red double vinyl

Singles 
 "Anthem" (2010), War on Music – limited edition split single with Propagandhi

Demos 
 Rehearsal (1984)
 Rehearsal No. 2 (1985)
 The Exorcism (1985), Diabolic Force
 Demo 1987 (1987)
 Demo 1989 (1989)

References 

 Sacrifice interview on Voices from the Dark Side by Laurent Ramadier

External links 

 

Canadian heavy metal musical groups
Canadian thrash metal musical groups
Musical groups established in 1983
Musical groups disestablished in 1993
Musical groups reestablished in 2006
Musical groups from Toronto
1983 establishments in Ontario
1993 disestablishments in Ontario
2006 establishments in Ontario
Sonic Unyon artists
Metal Blade Records artists